Thomas Gjørtz (born 7 June 1984) is a Norwegian professional football defender who currently is under contract with Norwegian team Manglerud Star Toppfotball. He has played one game for Aalesunds in the Norwegian Premier League.

References

1984 births
Living people
Norwegian footballers
Løv-Ham Fotball players
Manglerud Star Toppfotball players
Aalesunds FK players

Association football defenders